Jay Gilday is an indigenous folk musician from Canada.

Life and career
Jay Gilday was born in Yellowknife, Northwest Territories, and spent his youth there. He is a member of the Dene Nation through his mother, with his father being of Irish heritage. He is the brother of singer-songwriter Leela Gilday. After high school, he attended the University of Alberta, where he spent much time as a busker in Edmonton's LRT system. He was later featured in an episode of the television series Dene: A Journey that filmed his return to the Dene Nation later in life.

Gilday performs both with an eponymous eight-piece rock band and as a solo artist. In 2017, he was a recipient of a Western Canadian Music Award for his album Faster than Light, being named Indigenous Artist of the Year.

Albums
Gilday's first album, All That I Can Give for Now, was released in 2008. In 2016, he followed up with Faster Than Light. In 2019, Gilday released The Choice and the Chase, his third album.

Personal life
Gilday is the father of four children.

Discography
 All That I Can Give for Now (2008)
 Faster Than Light (2016)
 The Choice and the Chase (2019)

References

Canadian male singer-songwriters
Canadian singer-songwriters
Musicians from Yellowknife
University of Alberta alumni
Canadian folk musicians
Year of birth missing (living people)
Living people
21st-century Canadian male singers